Bobobobs is a series of fictional children's stories created by Henk Zwart and Nerida Zwart. The Bobobobs consists of several illustrated books and comics, and an animation children's television series produced in 1988. The Bobobobs stories were originally published by Standaard Uitgeverij in Belgium, with later animation and merchandising produced by BRB Internacional in Spain.

The Bobobobs animated children's television series is based upon the characters and stories created and written by Henk Zwart and Nerida Zwart. It was directed by Tim Reid and produced by the Spanish company BRB Internacional, who were also responsible for such series as Around the World with Willy Fog, Dogtanian and the Three Muskehounds, The World of David the Gnome and The Wisdom of the Gnomes during the 1980s. The television series, consisting of 26 episodes, was subsequently dubbed into English by Cinelume, with the participation of Telefilm Canada as well as being dubbed into Hungarian, Italian, Catalan, Dutch, Afrikaans and German. The English tune, with a length of over 2 minutes, was composed by Guido & Maurizio de Angelis, while the lyrics were written by Ted Mather and performed by Rita Irasena and Emilio Aragon.

Set in the distant past, the plot revolves around a group of nomadic miniature humanoids known as the Bobobobs, who live in a part of the universe far away from the Earth. One crew of these Bobobobs, led by Bob Wouter, the captain, sets sail in the Bobular Quest, their spaceship, described as a "galleon with a protective dome". They head towards Earth where they plan to save the humans from being terrorised by dinosaurs. Along the way they encounter a variety of different alien species, some of which are hostile, and use their psychic powers, such as their ability to become invisible and to teleport, to aid them.

In several countries, Bobobobs merchandise was produced, including tie-in books, and episodes of the series were released in both PAL and NTSC formats of VHS.

The Bobobobs story is to continue with the future publication of more illustrated children's books (expected 2011).

Episodes of the Bobobobs in English and Spanish can be watched online on the official YouTube channel of BRB Entertainment.
In 2012 BRB Entertainment made the entire Bobobobs series available for streaming in English on their official website.

Characters

 Bob Wouter – is the kindly, level-headed Bob (Captain) of the Bobular Quest with a wooden leg. He has the enormous task of leading his Bobobobs on their adventurous journey through the universe to a newly discovered planet (Earth).
 Little Wouter (Little Bob) – is Bob Wouter's son. He is a clever little boy, smarter than a lot of the Bobobobs think. He is Fuzz's best friend.
Blush (Blip) – is Cornelius' mascot and eternal companion. He is a floating fuzzy purple head with little arms and big friendly eyes.
 Cornelius – is the Bobular's chief astronomer. He is very old, has a long white beard and wears purple clothes and a purple wizard's hat. He is extremely wise, but because he is very old he often nods off to sleep leaving Peter, his assistant, to do most of his work.
 Willbur – is the son of the Bobobobs great leader, Big Bob, and Petronella's brother. He is the Bobular's not-so-handy handyman.
 Petronella – is a lady you do not want to tangle with. Since she is Big Bob's daughter she thinks she can order everyone around. She is mean to those around her, with the exception of her brother Willbur, and is constantly thinking of her own (non-existent) beauty. She is married to A.D.
 A.D. – is the Bobobob's architect and Petronella's hen-pecked husband who absorbs himself into his work.
 Fritz – is the temperamental cook. His food is nourishing but tastes terrible. He loses his temper with anyone he disagrees with, especially Aunt Agatha. His best friends are Ein & Stein.
 Aunt Agatha – is everybody's auntie. She sneaked aboard to look after her nephew Peter, but quickly became everyone's friend, especially Cornelius's. She is a very kindly old lady who does a lot of much-loved baking.
 Ein & Stein – are the Bobular's biologists. They are identical twins and never leave each other's side. Their main task is growing "Obus" plants for the Bobular Quest's crew. Although they tend to argue on a regular basis, they care for each other deeply.
 Peter – is Cornelius' assistant whose ambition is to be chief astronomer one day, but he has a lot to learn and Blip, Cornelius' little mate, doesn't make it easier for him.
 Doc Bone – is the Bobular's doctor who's a bit absent minded and has more eyes for Nurse Mimi than for his patients.
 Nurse Mimi – is Doc Bone's sweet young nurse. She is always ready to help those in need, especially Willbur.
 Big Bob – is the Bobobobs leader, and father of Petronella and Willbur.

Episodes

Series 1 (1988)
In all, 26 episodes were produced, including:

(*) Broadcast in a different order in some countries.

Series 2 (1989)

Voice actors and their characters
Walter Massey as Bob Wouter
Rick Jones as Cornelius/Blip
Dean Hagopian as Narrator
Andrew Bednarski as Little Bob
Michael Rudder as Willbur/Fritz
Kathleen Fee as Petronella
Richard Dumont as A.D.
Bronwen Mantel as Aunt Agatha/Nurse Mimi
A.J. Henderson as Ein/Doc Bone
Paul Zacaib as Stein
Mark Hellman as Peter

References

External links
TVWhirl entry
IMDB entry

1980s animated television series
Catalan television programmes
Spanish children's animated adventure television series
Channel 4 original programming
YTV (Canadian TV channel) original programming